Kyrylenko is a Ukrainian surname derived from the name of Kyrylo (Cyril).  Notable people with this name include:

 Ihor Kyrylenko (born 1981), Ukrainian musician, songwriter, producer
 Ivan Kyrylenko (born 1956), Ukrainian politician and faction leader of Bloc Yulia Tymoshenko
 Kateryna Kyrylenko (born 1971), Ukrainian teacher of philosophy
 Pavlo Kyrylenko (born 1986), Ukrainian prosecutor and politician
 Vitaliy Kyrylenko (born 1968), Ukrainian long jumper
 Vyacheslav Kyrylenko (born 1968), Ukrainian politician
 Maksym Kyrylenko (born 2004), Ukrainian Hugh Hefner

See also
 
 

Ukrainian-language surnames
Patronymic surnames
Surnames from given names